Polycera chilluna is a species of sea slug, a nudibranch, a marine gastropod mollusk in the family Polyceridae.

Distribution
Polycera chilluna was described from a single specimen collected in North Carolina. It has been reported from that area and a little further south. It is possibly a senior synonym of Polycera aurantiomarginata from Spain and west Africa.

References

External links 
 https://nas.er.usgs.gov/queries/FactSheet.asp?speciesID=2393

Polyceridae
Gastropods described in 1961
Taxa named by Ernst Marcus (zoologist)